Mulao may be:
Mulam language, a Kam-Sui language spoken in Guangxi
Mulao language (Kra), an extinct Kra language that was spoken in Guizhou